Institut national de recherche pédagogique (INRP) was the national French research institute for the field of education.

External links 
 

Research institutes in France